= Rebecca Azulay Romero =

Astronomer

Rebeca Azulay
- Born: 7 April 1988 (age 37); València, Spain
- Education: Universitat de València

Rebecca Azulay Romero (born 7 April 1988 in València) is a Valencian astronomer.

She studied at the IES Ramon Llull in València and later graduated in Mathematics and Astrophysics at the University of Valencia, where she specialized in radio astronomy.

She was part of the international team that, in 2019, managed to take a photograph of the shadow of a black hole for the first time in history.
